South Melbourne is an inner suburb in Melbourne, Victoria, Australia, 3 km south of Melbourne's Central Business District, located within the City of Port Phillip local government area. South Melbourne recorded a population of 11,548 at the 2021 census.

Historically known as Emerald Hill, it was one of the first of Melbourne's suburbs to adopt full municipal status and is one of Melbourne's oldest suburban areas, notable for its well preserved Victorian era streetscapes.

The current boundaries are complex. Starting at the east end of Dorcas Street, it runs along the rear of properties on St Kilda Road, then south along Albert Road, north up Canterbury Road, along the rear of the north side of St Vincent Place, zigzags west along St Vincent Street, then north up Pickles Street. There is then an arm of former industrial land to the west between Boundary Road, the freeway and Ferrars Street. It then runs along Market Street to Kingsway, then up Dorcas Street to St Kilda Road.

History

Before European settlement, the area now called South Melbourne stood out as largely flat with central hill (where the Town Hall now stands) surrounded by swampy land to the north and south. The hill was a traditional social and ceremonial meeting place for Aboriginal tribes.

The area was first invaded and colonised by Europeans in the 1840s and became known as Emerald Hill.

During the Victorian Gold Rush of 1851 a tent city, known as Canvas Town was established. The area soon became a massive slum, home to tens of thousands of fortune seekers from around the world.

Land sales at Emerald Hill began in 1852, and while the hill itself was reserved as the site for an orphanage, Canvas Town was soon replaced by cottages, including many that were prefabricated overseas in timber and corrugated iron. Independence from the City of Melbourne was granted when Emerald Hill was proclaimed a borough on 26 May 1855. In 1857, Melbourne's second railway line, to St Kilda, was created running through the new municipality.

The new municipality developed rapidly and by 1872 Emerald Hill was proclaimed a town. By the 1870s, parts of South Melbourne became a favoured place of residents for the wealthy, particularly in St Vincent Gardens, Melbourne's best London style residential square (which mostly lies in Albert Park), but most of the locality was developed with more modest single storey terraces and cottages, some in timber. The orphanage on the hill relocated in 1878, and the crest of the hill become the site of the South Melbourne Town Hall, built between 1879 and 1880, and designed in suitable grandeur to evoke the city's booming status, establishing a civic heart at Bank Street. In 1883 Emerald Hill became a city, changing its official name to South Melbourne.

South Melbourne experienced a decline in the 1950s as Melbourne sprawled outwards. Like many other Melbourne inner city suburbs, during the 1960s, the Housing Commission of Victoria stepped in and erected several high-rise public housing towers including the earliest high rise, Emerald Hill Court, and the tallest, Park Towers (c.1969). They soon housed some of Melbourne's postwar migrants, who also lived in the many modest cottages, adding a multicultural flavour to the area.

In the 1980s, like other inner suburban areas, South Melbourne's gentrification got under way, and many of the terrace houses and cottages were renovated and a new middle class moved in. From the 1990s, the industrial districts of South Melbourne, closer to the city, and including Southbank, have been redeveloped with mid and high rise apartments; in 1996 the most intensively developed part of Southbank was transferred to the City of Melbourne. At the same time, the City of South Melbourne was amalgamated with the Cities of St Kilda and Port Melbourne to create the City of Port Phillip.

Population

In the 2016 Census,  were 10,920 people in South Melbourne. 55.5% of people were born in Australia. The next most common countries of birth were England 4.8%, China 3.0%, New Zealand 2.8%, India 1.5% and Malaysia 1.4%. 66.5% of people spoke only English at home. Other languages spoken at home included Mandarin 3.9%, Greek 2.8%, Russian 1.9%, Cantonese 1.3% and Italian 1.2%. The most common responses for religion were No Religion 40.7% and Catholic 17.3%.

Transport

South Melbourne is served by tram routes 1, 12, 58, and 96. Route 96 runs along the former St Kilda railway line, which was converted to light rail in 1987.

In 2006 there were strong calls by a joint council project and the Inner Melbourne Action Group to provide an inner south tram link between the City of Port Phillip and the City of Stonnington, by connecting route 112 with route 8 via Park Street. This would have required less than 100 metres of track to be laid along the Park Street gap to create the new route.

Geography

Commercial areas
The main commercial district is centred on Clarendon Street and side streets, including an area around the South Melbourne Market, with many retailers, cafes, eateries, art galleries and more.

Like the Melbourne CBD, there are many small laneways in South Melbourne, most of them cobbled in bluestone.

Housing

South Melbourne's predominant housing is terraced or semi-detached Victorian.

Park Towers is a notable example of Housing Commission of Victoria hi-rise public housing. There are a number of such towers in parts of South Melbourne, built since the 1960s.

In recent years, South Melbourne has seen an increase in population density, due to apartment development in nearby Southbank, where development has spilled over from the Melbourne CBD. To the east, towards the St Kilda Road complex, are many high rise office buildings.

Heritage

The Victorian era terraced house and cottage areas of South Melbourne are extensive and mostly heritage-listed. A handful of original prefabricated cottages have survived, with a corrugated iron example in Coventry Street now a museum run by the National Trust. The elaborate town hall with its tall clock tower is one of the landmarks of Melbourne's heritage of Victorian architecture. The block that the town hall stands on was all developed in the late 1870s-1880s with substantial terrace houses and shops, and remains intact to this day.

See Yup Temple is a Chinese temple, built in 1856, is Melbourne's most notable reminder of the Chinese immigration during the gold rush.

Television industry

South Melbourne features television production studios owned by the Seven Network and Global Television in the south of the suburb. This was formerly the Melbourne studios of the Seven Network prior to them moving to the Melbourne Docklands's Digital Broadcast Centre. Several Seven Network shows like Deal or No Deal, Dancing with the Stars It Takes Two were filmed at the South Melbourne location whilst Seven News is filmed at Docklands.

Sport

South Melbourne FC is regarded as one of Australia's most successful soccer clubs, with four national titles to their name. They currently play in the Victorian Premier League at Lakeside Stadium, a rectangular stadium built on Lake Oval, the former home ground of the South Melbourne Swans. Historically, they have been known as South Melbourne Hellas, a tribute to the migrant Greek founders of the club and traditionally played at Middle Park.

It was once home to the South Melbourne Swans, which played in the Victorian Football League (VFL), which played out of the Lake Oval (now Lakeside Stadium) in nearby Albert Park, before relocating to Sydney in 1982 in a radical move, which eventually spawned the national Australian Football League. More recently a new athletics track and field facility replaced the earlier updated soccer ground however soccer is still present in the centre of the track.

Notable people

Notable people from or who lived in South Melbourne include:
 Ian Gardiner (1943–2008), artist, woodcut printmaker
 George King, Australian rules footballer (1892-1976)
 Robert MacGregor (1825–1883), politician and headmaster
 John Reid "Gentleman Jack" McGowan (1872–1912), champion boxer
 Herbert Henry "Dally" Messenger (1883–1959), champion rugby footballer
 Russell Mockridge (1928–1958), racing cyclist, Olympic Games gold medallist
 Max Papley (1940-present), Australian rules footballer
 Arthur Ted Powell (1947–present), landscape/cityscape artist and printmaker
 Bob Skilton (1938-present), Australian rules footballer
William John Wills (1834–1861), pioneering explorer-surveyor and eponymous member of 'the Burke and Wills expedition'

See also
 City of South Melbourne – South Melbourne was previously within this former local government area.

References

External links

Suburbs of Melbourne
Suburbs of the City of Port Phillip